Sofia Padilla (born 19 May 1989) is an Ecuadorian sports shooter. She competed in the Women's 10 metre air rifle event at the 2012 Summer Olympics.

References

External links
 

1989 births
Living people
Ecuadorian female sport shooters
Olympic shooters of Ecuador
Shooters at the 2012 Summer Olympics
Sportspeople from Guayaquil
Pan American Games competitors for Ecuador
Shooters at the 2011 Pan American Games
Shooters at the 2015 Pan American Games
South American Games silver medalists for Ecuador
South American Games medalists in shooting
Competitors at the 2014 South American Games
21st-century Ecuadorian women